Thames Clippers (since July 2020 branded as Uber Boat by Thames Clippers for sponsorship purposes with Uber) is a river bus service on the Thames in London, England.

The company operates both commuter services between eastern and Central London and tourist services under licence from London River Services. At present they transport around 10,000 passengers daily on average.

Company
Sean Collins co-founded Thames Clippers in 1999 with partner Alan Woods as Collins River Enterprises. Thames Clippers was then taken over in September 2006 by the American Anschutz Entertainment Group, who promised substantial investment into the company to upgrade the services and to provide a more frequent "hop-on-hop-off" between Central London and The O2 (formerly the Millennium Dome), also owned by the Anschutz Entertainment Group. In 2007 the company purchased six new catamarans to be used on the commuter service in order to carry a large number of passengers in a comfortable environment. In 2015 and 2017, a total of four new 'Hunt Class' catamarans were purchased for use primarily on the RB6 Service.

In July 2020, the company announced a partnership with U.S.-based ride-sharing service Uber, which acquired naming rights to the ferry and rebranding the service as Uber Boat by Thames Clippers.

In April 2022, global private markets investment firm Northleaf Capital Partners (“Northleaf”) acquired a majority interest in Thames Clippers from AEG, promising to bring new investment to support the company's plans to deliver sustainable growth, enhanced infrastructure and greater economic development on and around the River Thames.

Tickets
Thames Clippers operate under licence from Transport for London. The river boat service is now better integrated into the tube and bus ticketing network. From November 2009, Thames Clippers services started to accept Oyster pay as you go on all of its services, which also provides a discount on single and return fares. Contactless payment is also accepted.

A River Roamer ticket, valid for one day, is available from Thames Clippers which allows the holder to hop on and hop off along the banks of the Thames between Putney Pier and Woolwich Arsenal Pier (including the Canary Wharf - Rotherhithe Ferry). The cost is £21.00 for an adult and £42.00 for a family. An adult single trip fare changes depending on zones. They range from £5.20 to £14.70 (or £4.80 to £13.50 if payment is made online, in app or with an oyster or contactless card). 
There is a one third discount for holders of valid travelcards (excluding Family River Roamer tickets and fares for The O2 Express).

Special river service season tickets, valid for either 1 week, 1 month, or 1 year,  are also available.  Discounts for travelcard holders are also available on season tickets. Carnet tickets are also available via the Thames Clippers tickets app.

Park and Glide tickets are also available which grant access to the car park at The O2, and the River Bus.

Commuter services

RB1
During weekday mornings and evenings and throughout the weekend the service runs from Battersea Power Station in the west to Barking Riverside in the east. On weekday daytimes between the peak hours the service is truncated and serves piers between Westminster and North Greenwich. The service runs every 20 minutes during the day, and every 30 minutes in the very early morning and evenings. Stops from west to east:

RB2
During weekday daytimes (between the morning and evening peaks) the service runs from Battersea Power Station in the west to Greenwich in the east. At weekends the service runs all day between Battersea Power Station and North Greenwich (The O2). Stops from west to east:

RB4

Thames Clippers operates the direct cross river Canary Wharf – Rotherhithe Ferry, between Canary Wharf Pier and the Nelson Dock Pier at the Doubletree Docklands in Rotherhithe. The service uses smaller boats than the commuter service but runs at a higher frequency of every 20 minutes and every 10 minutes during peak times. The ferry can be used by guests of the hotel free of charge as well as by passengers not staying at the hotel at a cost.

RB6
This runs peak times Monday to Friday only. Stops are:
Putney
Wandsworth Riverside Quarter
Plantation Wharf
Chelsea Harbour
Cadogan
Battersea Power Station
Vauxhall (St George Wharf)
Millbank
Westminster
Embankment
Blackfriars
Bankside
London Bridge City
Tower
Canary Wharf

Trial service to Gravesend
In September 2017, Thames Clippers ran a trial commuter service between Gravesend and Central London.On 4 November 2022, Thames Clippers announced that they had completed the purchase of Gravesend Town Pier, with an aim to operating long-term River Bus services from the pier within the next 2–3 years.

Visitor/tourist services

Tate to Tate
The Tate to Tate is a ticketed leisure service between the Tate Modern at Bankside Pier and the Tate Britain at Millbank Pier. Passengers travel on the RB1 service on weekdays and the RB2 at weekends. Tickets can be purchased from the Tate galleries in addition to standard options.

The O2 Express
The O2 Express is an express service calling at London Eye Pier, Westminster Millennium Pier, Embankment Pier, London Bridge City Pier, Tower Millennium Pier, Greenwich Pier and North Greenwich Pier for The O2.  The service also provides private charters.

Fleet

Accidents
On 2 May 2004, a woman was killed after she was hit, while waiting for a boat, by a mooring bollard which had come loose from the Star Clipper at St. Katherine's Pier.

On 4 October 2011 at 7pm, the Moon Clipper hit the Tower Millennium Pier when it was carrying about 50 people. Four people were injured.

On 5 December 2016, the Typhoon Clipper collided with the workboat Alison, resulting in the sinking of the workboat. The two crew members on the workboat were taken to hospital.

Expansion
A Policy Exchange report from 2010 advocated significant expansion in river services on the Thames. The aim of the report is to lead to a "river tube line" being created which would lead to easing of current congestion on London's transport systems, and better quality of travel, at a significantly cheaper price than other options. Opponents note that the river capacity, especially at low tide could mean a reduction of tourist boats (especially at peak commuter times), and turn the Thames into an urban highway which would be detrimental to London. To be feasible, the report calls for better management of river traffic, improved interchange with other public transport modes and expansion of key piers.

The Mayor of London is responsible for the River Concordat group, which is made-up of over forty different organisations including Thames Clippers. The publication, By the River, sets out the strategic vision for improving river transport on the Thames.

They plan to expand further east down the river start with a calling at a pier in Silvertown in October 2019 and plans in the future to go to Thamesmead and Barking.

In 2017, Thames Clippers and London Resort made a deal for the provision of Clipper services between Central London and the proposed theme park located on the Swanscombe Peninsula in Kent. The Thames Clipper services are also planned to operate between the theme park and a park & ride car park located on the north side of the River Thames in Tilbury Docks. These services are scheduled to start operation when the theme park opens in 2024.

Sponsorship 
The first company to enter a partnership with Thames Clippers was NatWest in 2008. The boats were reliveried in black sponsorship stickers displaying the NatWest and Thames Clippers Logo. KPMG won a three-year sponsorship deal in 2011 and sponsored the clippers during the 2012 Olympics and Paralympics. In August 2014, MBNA the bank holding company signed a three-year sponsorship deal with Thames Clippers, and introduced a better ticketing system. In June 2020, American company Uber entered a new partnership with Thames Clippers whereby they won naming rights to the service. As of 2020, the service has been rebranded as "Uber Boat by Thames Clippers".

References

External links

Transport for London River Service information

1999 establishments in England
Anschutz Corporation
London River Services
Transport operators in London
Water taxis